α-Tocopherol (alpha-tocopherol) is a type of vitamin E. Its E number is "E307". Vitamin E exists in eight different forms, four tocopherols and four tocotrienols. All feature a chromane ring, with a hydroxyl group that can donate a hydrogen atom to reduce free radicals and a hydrophobic side chain which allows for penetration into biological membranes. Compared to the others, α-tocopherol is preferentially absorbed and accumulated in humans.

Vitamin E is found in a variety of tissues, being lipid-soluble, and taken up by the body in a wide variety of ways. The most prevalent form, α-tocopherol, is involved in molecular, cellular, biochemical processes closely related to overall lipoprotein and lipid homeostasis. Ongoing research is believed to be "critical for manipulation of vitamin E homeostasis in a variety of oxidative stress-related disease conditions in humans." One of these disease conditions is the α-tocopherol role in the use by malaria parasites to protect themselves from the highly oxidative environment in erythrocytes.

Stereoisomers 
α-Tocopherol has three stereocenters, so it is a chiral molecule. The eight stereoisomers of α-tocopherol differ in the configuration of these stereocenters. RRR-α-tocopherol is the natural one. The older name of RRR-α-tocopherol is d-α-tocopherol, but this d/l naming should no longer be used, because whether l-α-tocopherol should mean SSS enantiomer or the SRR diastereomer is not clear, from historical reasons. The SRR may be named 2-epi-α-tocopherol, the diastereomeric mixture of RRR-α-tocopherol and 2-epi-α-tocopherol may be called 2-ambo-α-tocopherol (formerly named dl-α-tocopherol). The mixture of all eight diastereomers is called all-rac-α-tocopherol.

One IU of tocopherol is defined as  milligram of RRR-α-tocopherol (formerly named d-α-tocopherol). 1 IU is also defined as 0.9 mg of an equal mix of the eight stereoisomers, which is a racemic mixture, all-rac-α-tocopheryl acetate. This mix of stereoisomers is often called dl-α-tocopheryl acetate. Starting with May 2016, the IU unit is made obsolete, such that 1 mg of "Vitamin E" is 1 mg of d-alpha-tocopherol or 2 mg of dl-alpha-tocopherol.

References 

Vitamin E